Aursmoen is a village in the municipality of Aurskog-Høland, Norway. Its population (2007) is 2,318.

Villages in Akershus
Aurskog-Høland